is a Japanese retired football player. He last played for FC Imabari.

Playing career
Uchimura joined FC Imabari on 10 January 2019, but he retired after just one year and the promotion of the club to J3 League.

Club statistics
.

References

External links

Profile at Hokkaido Consadole Sapporo

1984 births
Living people
Association football people from Ōita Prefecture
Japanese footballers
J1 League players
J2 League players
Japan Football League players
Oita Trinita players
Ehime FC players
Hokkaido Consadole Sapporo players
FC Imabari players
Association football forwards